The 1931–32 New York Americans season was the Americans' seventh season of play. The team again finished out of the playoffs, finishing fourth in the Canadian Division.

Offseason

Regular season

Final standings

Record vs. opponents

Game log

Playoffs
The Americans did not qualify for the playoffs.

Player stats

Regular season
Scoring

Goaltending

Playoffs
The Americans did not qualify for the playoffs.

Awards and records

Transactions

See also
1931–32 NHL season

References

New York Americans seasons
New York Americans
New York Americans
New York Amer
New York Amer
1930s in Manhattan
Madison Square Garden